Black Allan may refer to:

Black Allan (horse) Foundation sire of the Tennessee Walking Horse
Black Allan Barker, Australian musician